Nicha Lertpitaksinchai and Peangtarn Plipuech were the defending champions, but they lost in the first round.

Tang Haochen and Yang Zhaoxuan won the title, defeating Hsu Ching-wen and Lee Pei-chi in the final, 7–5, 6–1.

Seeds

Draw

References
 Main Draw

2015 ITF Women's Circuit